Rennos Frangoudis (27 February 1909 – 1 February 1982) was a Greek sprinter. He competed at the 1928, 1932 and the 1936 Summer Olympics.

References

1909 births
1982 deaths
Athletes (track and field) at the 1928 Summer Olympics
Athletes (track and field) at the 1932 Summer Olympics
Athletes (track and field) at the 1936 Summer Olympics
Greek male sprinters
Olympic athletes of Greece
Sportspeople from Limassol